Richard Edwards (born 25 August 1956 in Llanelli) is a former Welsh Labour politician who was a Member of the National Assembly for Wales for Preseli Pembrokeshire from 1999 to 2003.  Before politics he worked in local government and was a political researcher.

Background
He was educated at Queen Elizabeth Grammar School, Carmarthen and holds a PhD from the University of Birmingham. He is a member of the Institute of Chartered Secretaries and Administrators and a member of Unison.

He is a cousin of BBC Newsreader Huw Edwards.

Political career
He was Mayor of Carmarthen in 1997. Member of the National Assembly for Wales for Preseli Pembrokeshire from 1999 to 2003. Shortly after being selected as a candidate he was diagnosed with leukemia, he was elected in 1999 and stood down at the 2003 election.

In the First Assembly, he was Chair of the Local Government and Environment Committee, then the Environment, Planning and Transport Committee from March 2000.

References

Profile on BBC Website September 1999

Offices held

1956 births
Living people
Wales AMs 1999–2003
Councillors in Wales
Welsh Labour members of the Senedd
Alumni of the University of Birmingham
People educated at Queen Elizabeth High School, Carmarthen
Mayors of places in Wales